The M-1965 Field Jacket (also known as M65, M-65 Field Jacket, and Coat, Cold Weather, Man's Field), eponymously named after the year it was introduced, is a popular field jacket initially designed for the United States Armed Forces under the MIL-C-43455J standard, produced by Alpha Industries, the Southern Athletic Co.; the John Ownbey Co., and the Golden Mfg. Co., among others.

It was introduced into U.S. military service in 1965 to replace the previous M-1951 field jacket, itself an improvement on the M-1943 field jacket introduced during World War II, although the M-51 continued to be issued for quite some time. 

The front portion of the jacket has two large hip pockets and two medium-sized breast pockets. The collar of the jacket features a zipper which houses a protective hood. The M-1965 field jacket can be combined with a button-in insulated lining for cold-weather wear, as well as a button-on fur trimmed winter hood. The jacket is fastened with a large aluminum or brass (later nylon) zipper, with a storm flap fastened with snaps covering it.

The jacket is constructed of a durable cotton or cotton-nylon or cotton-polyester blend sateen fabric, which was windproof due to its tight weave and water resistant due to that and chemical treatment, originally in OG-107,  first without epaulets and utilizing an aluminum zipper like the M-51 before it, then with epaulets and still with the aluminum zipper, then with the brass zipper. Like many other uniform items at the time and in the past, Marine Corps examples were stamped with "USMC". Later, the jacket was issued in the brown-dominant "Woodland" ERDL camouflage pattern in 1981, (shortly after which the brass hood zipper was replaced with a nylon one, with the main zip soon following) coinciding with the introduction of the Battle Dress Uniform (BDU), shortly after  then in the Desert Battle Dress Uniform (DBDU) and the Desert Camouflage Uniform (DCU) patterns as well, before finally being used in the Army Combat Uniform (ACU), employing the rather short-lived Universal Camouflage Pattern (UCP) before finally having been retired, by which time the normal name and branch tape and division patch locations were outfitted with Velcro. The jacket has also been produced for civilian use since at least the early 1970s, and is and has been available in many different colors and patterns, many of which were never used by the United States Army or any other armed service.

The M-65 field jacket was widely used by United States forces during the Vietnam War in which the jacket became useful for troops serving in the Central Highlands of South Vietnam due to its wind and rain resistance, especially in the monsoon season and after. It was and is a standard issue to US troops in several other wars all around the globe as well, due to its long service life.

See also
Uniforms of the United States Army
U.S. Army M-1943 Uniform
M-1951 field jacket
Extended Cold Weather Clothing System
OG-107
Battle Dress Uniform

References

United States Army uniforms
Jackets
1980s fashion
United States military uniforms
Military equipment introduced in the 1960s